Devaki  is a Hindi  film released on 6 January 2006. The film directed by Bappaditya Bandopadhyay stars Ram Kapoor, Suman Ranganathan, Arvin Tucker and Perizaad Zorabian. The film was premiered at the Osian Cinefan Asian Film Festival in July 2005. Since then it has traveled to 11 International Film Festival amidst much critical accolades and has been touted as a 'must watch for every woman'. Nominated for the best feature film at São Paulo International Film Festival, Brazil, Ashville International Film Festival, North Carolina, Global Knight International Film Festival, Malta, and Golden Gate International Film Festival, San Francisco, it won the award in Asheville. Officially released on 6 January 2006, this small film has been doing the rounds in the video stores for some time.

The plot is derived from a real-life incident where a tribal woman named Devakibai was sold in an open auction in Pandhana, a sub-division of Khandwa district in Madhya Pradesh, in January 2003. The auction was organized by the Maha Panchayat Panchaganga and  legitimized by the presence of Hiralal Silawat, Minister of   Fisheries, who inaugurated the function. This atrocity was uncovered by journalist Deepak Tiwari and became the cover story of the magazine, The Week.

Plot
Devaki takes a look at the parallel lives of two young women, belonging to strikingly different backgrounds, who were both betrayed by their fathers and lovers.

Devaki (Suman Ranganathan) is a village girl who is forced into marriage to a 70-year-old man. On the night of the marriage, she is raped by the brother of the impotent old man in order to establish the age-old practice of physical dominance of the male over the female. She develops a relation with a low-caste runaway boy but the villagers catch them in the act of love-making and they are brought before the Panchayat. Devaki is made to stand holding a heavy stone on her head, the severity of the punishment aimed at setting an example to other women. The villagers and the Panchayat decide to auction Devaki to the highest bidder and pay the money to the 70-year-old husband. Once again, another old man buys her.

The life of Nandini (Perizaad Zorabian) is more complicated. In protest against the feudal practices in Devaki's village, Nandini, an urban girl who has come to the village to work as an NGO activist trying to empower the village women through literacy and awareness, quits her job and goes back to the city. Soon, she finds out that in some respects urban life is no different to village life. Economically betrayed and physically used by her lover Rahul (Ram Kapoor), she feels herself losing self-respect and betrayed and disillusioned by Rahul's treatment of his pregnant wife, Sumana, and the lies he has been telling both women. She forces herself to end the illicit relationship and joins an advertising agency. But she is shocked to find out that her selfish father (George Baker), who had deserted the family many years ago, owns the agency. He doesn't seem to remember that he left behind a wife who is now in a mental asylum, still awaiting his return, and a daughter whom he doesn't recognize though she works for him. The ultimate betrayal comes when her father-boss advises her to satisfy his client sexually to clinch a deal and offers her 2% of the profit as a reward. She decides to sell herself to this lecherous old man, avenging her father's betrayal by sacrificing herself. Her vindication comes in the form of his shock when she eventually tells him the truth.

Cast 
Ram Kapoor...Rahul
Suman Ranganathan....Devaki
Arvin Tucker ...
Perizaad Zorabian...Nandini
Neelanjan Bose....
George Baker.... Father of Nandini
Raman Kapoor...

Release
United States -September 2005(Temecula Valley International Film Festival)
Brazil-23 September 2005 (Festival do Rio BR)
India- 6 January 2006    
Singapore-16 April 2006

Awards 
Best Feature Film Award at the Asheville Film Festival-North Carolina-U.S.

Music
Dhuan Dhuan Hain Dhuan - Jojo
Dil Naiyyo Naiyyo - Jojo
Toree Bahiya Mai - Jojo

References

External links 
 
www.citwf.com-Devaki
www.gomolo.in
www.telegraphindia.com

2005 films
2005 drama films
Indian drama films
2000s Hindi-language films
Films scored by Bickram Ghosh
Films scored by Amar Haldipur
Films directed by Bappaditya Bandopadhyay
Hindi-language drama films